The Missouri Wing of Civil Air Patrol (CAP) is the highest echelon of Civil Air Patrol in the state of Missouri. Missouri Wing headquarters are located in Whiteman Air Force Base. The Missouri Wing consists of over 800 cadet and adult members at 28 locations across the state of Missouri.

Mission
The Missouri Wing performs the three missions of Civil Air Patrol: providing emergency services; offering cadet programs for youth; and providing aerospace education for Civil Air Patrol members and the general public.

Emergency services
Civil Air Patrol performs search and rescue missions, directed by the Air Force Rescue Coordination Center at Tyndall Air Force Base. Civil Air Patrol provides air and ground transportation and an extensive communications network during disaster relief efforts, and conducts aerial photography of damaged areas after natural disasters. The CAP provides Air Force support, including light transport, communications support, and low-altitude route survey. The CAP also provides assistance in counter-drug operations.

Cadet programs
Civil Air Patrol provides a program for cadets aged 12 to 21, which is conducted as a 16-step program including aerospace education, leadership training, physical fitness and moral leadership.

Aerospace education
Civil Air Patrol offers aerospace education for CAP members and the general public by providing training to CAP cadets, and offering workshops for youth throughout the nation through schools and public aviation events.

Organization

Legal protection
Members of Civil Air Patrol who are employed by the state of Missouri, or who work for a company with fifty or more employees, are guaranteed under Missouri law a leave of absence in order to respond to emergency missions as a part of Civil Air Patrol for up to fifteen days per calendar year, or without regard to the length of time when responding to a state or nationally declared emergency in the state of Missouri. The leave is to be granted without loss of time, pay, regular leave, impairment of efficiency rating or of any other rights or benefits to which such an employee would otherwise be entitled.

See also
Missouri Air National Guard
Missouri Naval Militia
Missouri Reserve Military Force

References

External links
Missouri Wing Civil Air Patrol official website

Wings of the Civil Air Patrol
Education in Missouri
Military in Missouri